The 2016–17 Asia League Ice Hockey season was the 14th season of Asia League Ice Hockey. The league consisted of nine teams from China, Japan, Russia, and South Korea. A new team for the season was the Daemyung Killer Whales. Daemyung Sangmu left the league. In addition, two more teams from China applied to join the league prior to this season. However, their inclusion was not possible earlier than the 2017–18 season.

Participating teams
The table below reveals participating teams in the 2016–17 season, their residence, and when they joined Asia League Ice Hockey.

Regular season
Below is the final standings in the regular season.

y – Clinched first-round bye; x – Clinched playoff spot; e - Eliminated from playoff contention.

Playoffs

References 

Asia League Ice Hockey
Asia League Ice Hockey seasons
Asia
Asia